Nationality words link to articles with information on the nation's poetry or literature (for instance, Irish or France).

Events

 April – National Poetry Month established by the Academy of American Poets as a way to increase awareness and appreciation of poetry in the United States.
 Summer/Autumn – Ledbury Poetry Festival established in England.
 November 11 – A memorial to John Betjeman is unveiled in Poets' Corner of Westminster Abbey by Lady Wilson.

Works published in English
Listed by nation where the work was first published and again by the poet's native land, if different; substantially revised works listed separately:

Australia
 Raewyn Alexander, Fat, Auckland: Penguin
 Robert Gray, Lineations
 Jennifer Harrison: Cabramatta/Cudmirrah (Black Pepper)
 Les Murray:
 Late Summer Fires
 Subhuman Redneck Poems, Carcanet and Sydney, Duffy & Snellgrove winner of the 1996 T. S. Eliot Prize
 Peter Porter, editor, The Oxford book of Modern Australian Verse, Melbourne: Oxford University Press
 Philip Salom: Feeding the Ghost. (Penguin)

Canada
 Roo Borson, Water Memory,  American-Canadian
 Cyril Dabydeen, editor, Another Way to Dance: Contemporary Asian Poetry from Canada and the United States, Toronto: TSAR
 Kristjana Gunnar, Exiles Among You
 Dennis Lee, Nightwatch: New and Selected Poems, 1968-1996
 Sylvia Legris:
ash petals (chapbook)
Circuitry of Veins
 Steve McCaffery, The Cheat of Words
 George McWhirter, A Staircase for All Souls
 Erín Moure, Search Procedures
 Janis Rapoport, After Paradise
 Joe Rosenblatt, The Voluptuous Gardener. (new poetry and selected drawings from Carleton University Art Gallery permanent collection) Beach Holme Press.
 Stephen Scobie, Taking the Gate: A Journey Through Scotland
 Raymond Souster, Close to Home. Ottawa: Oberon Press.

India, in English
 Keki N. Daruwalla, A Summer of Tigers ( Poetry in English ), Delhi: Oxford University Press
 Kamala Das, My Story, New Delhi: Sterling Publishers; autobiography

Ireland
 Pat Boran, The Shape of Water (Dedalus), Ireland
 Ciaran Carson, Opera Et Cetera, Oldcastle: Gallery Press, 
 Seán Dunne, Time and the Island, Oldcastle: Gallery Press, 
 Seamus Heaney, The Spirit Level
 Thomas McCarthy, The Lost Province, Anvil Press, London
 Ulick O'Connor, Poems of the Damned, a translation of Les Fleurs du mal from the original French of Charles Baudelaire
 Bernard O'Donoghue, Gunpowder, Irish poet living in and published in the United Kingdom

New Zealand
 James K. Baxter, posthumous, Cold Spring : Baxter's Unpublished Early Collection, edited by Paul Millar, Auckland: Oxford University Press
 Alan Brunton, Romaunt of Glossa: a saga, Bumper Books
 Alistair Campbell, Pocket: Collected Poems, Christchurch: Hazard Press
 Allen Curnow, New and Collected Poems 1941-1995
 Maurice Gee, Loving Ways
 Bill Manhire:
 My Sunshine
 Sheet Music: Poems 1967-1982

United Kingdom
 John Agard and Grace Nichols, A Caribbean Dozen: A Collection of Poems, London: Walker Books (children's book)
 James Berry, Playing a Dazzler
 Ciarán Carson: Opera Et Cetera, Bloodaxe, Wake Forest University Press, Irish poet published in the United Kingdom
 Carol Ann Duffy:
 Salmon - Carol Ann Duffy: Selected Poems, Salmon Poetry
 Editor, with Trisha Rafferty, Stopping for Death, Viking (anthology)
 T. S. Eliot, Inventions of the March Hare: Poems 1909-1917, early unpublished verse that the author had said he never wanted published; edited by Christopher Ricks; posthumous
 Seamus Heaney, The Spirit Level Faber & Faber; Northern Ireland poet published in the United Kingdom
 John Heath-Stubbs, Galileo's Salad
 Tobias Hill, Midnight in the City of Clocks
 Grace Nichols, Sunris (no "e" in the title), London: Virago Press
 Bernard O'Donoghue, Gunpowder, Irish poet living in and published in the United Kingdom
 Iona Opie, editor, My Very First Mother Goose, a collection of nursery rhymes
 Alice Oswald, The Thing in the Gap-Stone Stile, Oxford University Press, 
 Craig Raine, Clay: Whereabouts Unknown
 Peter Reading, Collected Poems 1985–1996
 Peter Redgrove:
 Assembling a Ghost
 The Book of Wonders: The Best of Peter Redgrove's Poetry, edited by Jeremy Robinson
 Iain Sinclair, editor, Conductors of Chaos: A Poetry Anthology, anthology of poets associated with or seen as precursors to the British Poetry Revival; Picador
 Benjamin Zephaniah, Propa Propaganda

Criticism, scholarship, and biography in the United Kingdom
 Anthony Cronin, Samuel Beckett: The Last Modernist (London: HarperCollins), one of The New York Times "notable books of the year" for 1997, when it was published in the United States (Irish poet and scholar published in the United Kingdrom)

United States
 Elizabeth Alexander, Body of Life
 A.R. Ammons, Brink Road
 Virginia Hamilton Adair, Ants on the Melon, the author's first book of poems, at age 83
Joseph Brodsky: So Forth : Poems, New York: Farrar, Straus & Giroux Russian-American
 Raymond Carver, All of Us: The Collected Poems
 Juliana Chang, editor, Quiet Fire: A Historical Anthology of Asian American poetry, 1892-1970, New York: The Asian American Writers' Workshop
 Ed Dorn, High West Rendezvous
 Robert Fagles, translator, The Odyssey, from the original Ancient Greek of Homer
 Donald Hall, The Old Life, four short poems, a long poem and three elegies
 Robert Hass, Sun Under Wood, lyric poems
 Louise Glück, Meadowlands
 Haim Gouri, Milim Be-Dami Holeh Ahavah ("Words in My Love-Sick Blood"), selected poems in English translation Detroit: Wayne State University Press,  
 Paul Henry, Captive Audience, Seren
 Mark Jarman and David Mason, editors, Rebel Angels: 25 Poets of the New Formalism
 Ronald Johnson, ARK (Albuquerque: Living Batch Press & University of New Mexico Press)
 Kenneth Koch, The Art of Poetry, Ann Arbor, Michigan: University of Michigan Press (criticism)
 Maxine Kumin, Connecting the Dots
 James McMichael, The World at Large: New and Selected Poems, 1971-1996
 W. S. Merwin
 Editor, Lament for the Makers: A Memorial Anthology, Washington: Counterpoint
 Translator, Pieces of Shadow: Selected Poems of Jaime Sabines
 The Vixen: Poems, New York: Knopf
 Robert Pinsky, The Figured Wheel: New and Collected Poems, 1966-1996
 James Reiss, The Parable of Fire
 Patti Smith, The Coral Sea
 Gary Snyder, Mountains and Rivers Without End
 Brian Swann, editor, Wearing the Morning Star: Native American Song-Poems, New York: Random House
 Henry Taylor, Understanding Fiction: Poems 1986-1996
 C. K. Williams, The Vigil

Poets in The Best American Poetry 1996
Poems from these 75 poets were in The Best American Poetry 1996, edited by David Lehman, guest editor Adrienne Rich:

Latif Asad Abdullah
Sherman Alexie
Margaret Atwood
Thomas Avena
Marie Annharte Baker
Sidney Burris
Rosemary Catacalos
Marilyn Chin
Wanda Coleman
Jacqueline Dash
Ingrid de Kok
William Dickey
Nancy Eimers
Nancy Eimers
Martin Espada

Martin Espada
Beth Ann Fennelly
Robert C. Fuentes
Rámon Garcia, Salmo
Suzanne Gardinier
Frank Gaspar
Reginald Gibbons
C. S. Giscombe
Kimiko Hahn
Gail Hanlon
Henry Hart
William Heyen
Jonathan Johnson
Jane Kenyon
August Kleinzahler

Yusef Komunyakaa
Stanley Kunitz
Natasha Le Bel
Natasha Le Bel
Carolyn Lei-Lanilau
Valerie Martínez
Davis McCombs
Sandra McPherson
James Merrill
W. S. Merwin
Jane Miller
Susan Mitchell
Pat Mora
Alice Notley
Naomi Shihab Nye

Alicia Ostriker
Raymond Patterson
Carl Phillips
Wing Ping
Sterling Plumpp
Katherine Alice Power
Reynolds Price
Alberto Álvaro Ríos
Pattiann Rogers
Quentin Rowan
David Shapiro
Angela Shaw
Reginald Shepherd
Enid Shomer
Gary Soto

Jean Starr
Deborah Stein
Roberta Tejada
Chase Twichell
Luís Alberto Urrea
Jean Valentine
Alma Luz Villanueva
Karen Volkman
Diane Wakoski
Ron Welburn
Susan Wheeler
Paul Wilis
Anne Winters
C. Dale Young
Ray A. Young Bear

Other in English
 Sir Muhammad Iqbal, Bang-i-Dara (The Call Of The Marching Bell), a philosophical poetry book in Urdu; M.A.K. Khalil translation into English of the 1923 work

Works published in other languages
Listed by language or nation where the work was first published and again by the poet's native land, if different; substantially revised works listed separately:

Arabic
 Abd al-Wahhab Al-Bayyati, "The Dragon", Iraq
 Books of poetry by:
 in Egypt: Muhammad Salih (poet), Rif'at Sallam, Imad Abu-Salih, and Muhammad Mutawalli
 in Lebanon: Yahya Jabir, 'Abduh Wazin, and Bassam Hajjar
 in Syria: Nuri al-Jarrah
 in Morocco: 'Abd al-Latif Lu'abi, Muhammad Binnis, M. Bin Talhah, Mahdi Khuraif, and Tiraibaq Ahmad

Denmark
 Naja Marie Aidt, Huset overfor
 Niels Frank, Tabernakel
 Katrine Marie Guldager, Blank, publisher: Gyldendal
 Klaus Høeck, Skovene (døden), publisher: Gyldendal
 Per Højholt, Anekdoter, the end of the author's Praksis series in poetry and prose
 Klaus Rifbjerg, Leksikon
 Søren Ulrik Thomsen; Denmark:
 Det skabtes vaklen: Arabesker ("The Shaking of Creation"), poetry"
 En dans på gloser, ("Dancing Attendance on the Word,"), critical essays

French language

Canada, in French
 Denise Desautels, «Ma joie», crie-t-elle ("'My joy', she cried"), illustrated with drawings by Francine Simonin, Montréal: Le Noroît
 Suzanne Jacob, Les écrits de l'eau, Montréal: l'Hexagone
 Serge Patrice Thibodeau, Traversée du désert

Switzerland, in French
 Markus Hediger, Ne retournez pas la pierre, Editions de l'Aire, Vevey

France
 Michel Butor, A la frontière
 Bertrand Degott, Éboulements et Taillis
 Claude Esteban, Sur la dernière lande, Fourbis
 Michel Houellebecq, Le Sens du combat, poèmes, Flammarion
 Abdellatif Laabi, Le Spleen de Casablanca. La Différence, Paris, Moroccan author writing in French and published in France
 Dominique Pagnier, La Faveur de l'obscurité
 Esther Tellermann, Pangeia
 Joël Vernet, Totems de sable

Germany
 Christoph Buchwald, general editor, Michael Brown and Michael Buselmeier, guest editors, Jahrbuch der Lyrik 1996/97 ("Poetry Yearbook 1996/97"), publisher: Beck; anthology
 Sarah Kirsch, Bodenlos, winner of the Büchner-Preis
 Inge Müller, Irgendwo: noch einmal möcht ich sehn, poetry, prose, diary, edited and with commentary by Ines Geipel
 Bert Papenfuß, Berliner Zapfenstreich: Schnelle Eingreifsgesänge

Hebrew
 Ory Bernstein, Zman shel aherim ("Temps des autres")
 Roni Somek, Gan eden le-orez ("Rice Paradise")
 Avner Treinin, Ma`a lot Ahaz ("The Dial of Ahaz")
 Nathan Zach, Mikhevan she`ani baSviva ("Because I'm Around")

India
Listed in alphabetical order by first name:
 Amarjit Chandan, Beejak, Navyug, New Delhi; Punjabi-language
 Gagan Gill, Andhere men Buddha, New Delhi: Rajkamal Prakashan, New Delhi, 1996, Bharatiya Jnanpith; Hindi-language
 Jiban Narah, Tumi Poka Dhanar Dore, Guwahati, Assam: Puthiniketan; Indian, Assamese-language
 Kedarnath Singh, Bagh, Delhi: Bharatiya Jnanpith; Hindi-language
 K. Satchidanandan, Malayalam; Malayalam-language
 Nilmani Phookan, Cheena Kavita, Guwahati, Assam: Students’ Store, Assamese-language
 Raghavan Atholi, Kandathi, Thrissur: Current Books; Malayalam-language
 Saleel Wagh, Nivadak Kavita, Pune: Time and Space Communications; Marathi-language
 Vasant Abaji Dahake, Shunah-shepa; Marathi-language

Italy
 Eugenio Montale, Diario postumo: 66 poesie e altre, edited by Annalisa Cima; publisher: Mondadori
 Maria Luisa Spaziani, I fasti dell’ortica
 Andrea Zanzotto, Meteo

Latin America
Sergio Badilla Castillo, Nordic Saga Monteverdi Editions. 1996, Santiago de Chile.

Norway
 Erling Aadland, Poetisk tenkning i Rolf Jacobsens lyrikk, analysis of the verse of Rolf Jacobsen; criticism
 Inger Hagerup, a book of poetry
 Gunvor Hofmo, Samlede dikt
 Sigmund Mjelve, a book of poetry

Poland
 Stanisław Barańczak, Poezja i duch uogolnienia. Wybor esejow 1970-1995 ("Poetry and the Spirit of Generalization: Selected Essays"), criticism; Kraków: Znak
 Urszula Koziol, Wielka pauza (“The Great Pause”)
 Ryszard Krynicki, Magnetyczny punkt. Wybrane wiersze i przeklady ("The Magnetic Point: Selected Poems and Translations"); Warsaw: CiS
 Ewa Lipska, Wspólnicy zielonego wiatraczka. Lekcja literatury z Krzysztofem Lisowskim ("Partners of the Green Fan: Literature Lesson with Krzysztofem Lisowskim"), selected poems, Kraków: Wydawnictwo literackie
 Czeslaw Milosz:
 Legendy nowoczesnoshci (“Legends of Modernity”), wartime essays and wartime correspondence with Jerzy Andrzejewski
 Cóz to za goshcia mielishmy ("What a Guest We Had"), a biography of his friend, the late poet Anna Swirszczynska
 Tadeusz Różewicz, Zawsze fragment. Recycling ("Always a Fragment: Recycling"), Wrocław: Wydawnictwo Dolnośląskie
 Wisława Szymborska: Widok z ziarnkiem piasku ("View with a Grain of Sand"), the author was the winner of the Nobel Prize in Literature this year
 Jan Twardowski, Rwane prosto z krzaka ("Torn Straight From the Bush") Warsaw: PIW

Russian
 Yevgeny Yevtushenko, "Trinadtsat" ("The Thirteen"), a long poem alluding to "Dvenadtsat" ("The Twelve") by Aleksandr Blok, about the Russian Revolution
 Books of poetry were published by Bella Akhmadulina, Sergey Biryukov, Oleg Chukhontsev, Arkady Dragomoshchenko, Vladimir Gandelsman, Sergey Gandlevsky, Yelena Kabysh, Svetlana Kekova, Aleksandr Kushner, Ilya Kutik, Aleksey Parshchikov, Dmitry Prigov, Lev Rubinshtein, Yelena Shvarts, Genrikh Sapgir, Vladimir Sokolov, and Andrey Voznesensky

Spain
 Matilde Camus, Reflexiones a medianoche ("Midnight thoughts")

Sweden
 Lars Gustafsson, Variationer över ett tema av Silfverstolpe
 Gunnar D. Hansson, AB Neanderthal
 Juris Kronbergs, Vilks vienacis ("Wolf One-Eye", Latvian)
 Lukas Moodysson, Souvenir
 Göran Sonnevi, Mozarts tredje hjärna
 Jesper Svenbro, Vid budet att Santo Bambino di Aracœli slutligen stulits av maffian
 Tomas Tranströmer, Sorgegondolen

Yiddish
 Yoysef Bar-El, Di shire fun Yankev Fridman ("The Poetry of Yankev Fridman"), criticism
 Yoysef Kerler and Boris Karlov (poet), Shpigl-ksav ("Mirror-writing"); the authors are father and son; Israel
 Yitskhok Niborski, Vi fun a pustn fas ("As Though out of an Empty Barrel"); Israel
 Hadasa Rubin, Rays nisht op di blum ("Don't Tear Up the Flower"); Israel
 Yankev Tsvi Shargel, Tsum eygenem shtern ("To My Own Star"); translations and original poems; Israel

Other
 Gerrit Komrij, Kijken is bekeken worden; Netherlands
 Wang Huairang, Zhongguoren: buguide ren ("Chinese: A People Not on Its Knees"), China
 Krystyna Rodowska, Na dole płomień W górze płomień, Poland
 Tadeusz Różewicz, Zawsze fragment, Poland
 Hilmi Yavuz, Çöl (“Desert”); Turkey

Awards and honors
 Nobel prize: Wislawa Szymborska

Australia
 C. J. Dennis Prize for Poetry: Peter Bakowski, In the Human Night
 Kenneth Slessor Prize for Poetry: Eric Beach, Weeping for Lost Babylon
 Mary Gilmore Prize: Morgan Yasbincek - Night Reversing

Canada
 Gerald Lampert Award: Maureen Hynes, Rough Skin
 Archibald Lampman Award: Gary Geddes, The Perfect Cold Warrior
 1996 Governor General's Awards: E. D. Blodgett, Apostrophes: Woman at a Piano (English); Serge Patrice Thibodeau, Le Quatuor de l'errance / La Traversée du désert (French)
 Pat Lowther Award: Lorna Crozier, Everything Arrives at the Light
 Prix Alain-Grandbois: Hélène Dorion, Sans bord, sans bout du monde
 Dorothy Livesay Poetry Prize: Patrick Lane, Too Spare, Too Fierce
 Prix Émile-Nelligan: Carle Coppens, Poèmes contre la montre

United Kingdom
 Cholmondeley Award: Elizabeth Bartlett, Dorothy Nimmo, Peter Scupham, Iain Crichton Smith
 Eric Gregory Award: Sue Butler, Cathy Cullis, Jane Griffiths, Jane Holland, Chris Jones, Sinéad Morrissey, Kate Thomas
 Forward Poetry Prize Best Collection: John Fuller, Stones and Fires (Chatto & Windus)
 Forward Poetry Prize Best First Collection: Kate Clanchy, Slattern (Chatto & Windus)
 Orange Prize for Fiction: Helen Dunmore, A Spell of Winter
 Queen's Gold Medal for Poetry: Peter Redgrove
 T. S. Eliot Prize (United Kingdom and Ireland): Les Murray, Subhuman Redneck Poems
 Whitbread Award for poetry and for book of the year (United Kingdom): Seamus Heaney, The Spirit Level

United States
 Agnes Lynch Starrett Poetry Prize: Helen Conkling, Red Peony Night
 AML Award for poetry to Leslie Norris for Collected Poems
 Bernard F. Connors Prize for Poetry: John Voiklis, "The Princeling's Apology", and (separately) Sarah Arvio, "Visits from the Seventh"
 Bobbitt National Prize for Poetry: Kenneth Koch, One Train
 National Book Award for poetry: Hayden Carruth, Scrambled Eggs & Whiskey
 Pulitzer Prize for Poetry: Jorie Graham: The Dream of the Unified Field
 Ruth Lilly Poetry Prize: Gerald Stern
 Wallace Stevens Award: Adrienne Rich
 Whiting Awards: Brigit Pegeen Kelly, Elizabeth Spires, Patricia Storace
 Fellowship of the Academy of American Poets: Jay Wright

Awards and honors elsewhere
 Denmark:
 Golden Laurels: Henrik Nordbrandt
 Critics' Prize: Per Højholt
 Japan: Sakutaro Hagiwara Prize in Poetry: Masao Tsuji for Haikai Tsuji shu ("Poems of Haikai Tsuji")
 Spain: Cervantes Prize: José García Nieto
 Turkey: President's Award: Cahit Külebi

Deaths

Birth years link to the corresponding "[year] in poetry" article:
 January 28 – Joseph Brodsky, 55 (born 1940), a Russian-American poet and essayist who won the Nobel Prize in Literature (1987) and was chosen Poet Laureate of the United States (1991–1992), of a heart attack
 February 11 – Amelia Rosselli, 66 (born 1950), Italian poet and ethnomusicologist, from suicide, on the same date Sylvia Plath killed herself.
 March 18 – Odysseus Elytis, Greek
 April 13 – George Mackay Brown, 74, Scottish poet, author and dramatist
 May 8 – Larry Levis, 49, American poet, of a heart attack
 May 11 – Sam Ragan (born 1915), American poet, journalist; North Carolina Poet Laureate, 1982–1996
 August 18 – Geoffrey Dearmer, 103, British poet
 September 25 – Mina Loy, 83, artist, poet, Futurist, actor
 November 24 – Sorley MacLean, 85, Scottish
 December 10 – Dorothy Porter, 54, Australian poet
 December 14 – Gaston Miron, 68 Canada
 Date not known:
 Haermann Kesten (born 1900), German
 Tom Rawling (born 1916), English poet and angler
 Constance Urdang, American poet and novelist, wife of Donald Finkel

See also

Poetry
List of years in poetry
List of poetry awards

References

20th-century poetry
Poetry